The 2003 São Tomé and Príncipe coup d'état attempt was an attempted military coup in São Tomé and Príncipe on July 16, 2003. The coup was launched against the government of President Fradique de Menezes, and was led by Major Fernando Pereira. The coup leaders claimed that they had tried to overthrow the government to help stop poverty in the region.

Background
The island nation experienced political instability previously. Just months before the 2003 coup attempt, President Menezes dissolved Parliament over disagreements related to issues of presidential power. The situation was resolved after negotiations between both sides which produced an agreement to carry out reforms by 2006.

Coup details
President Menezes was out of the country, on a private trip to Nigeria when the coup began on July 16. The coup was led by members of the Christian Democratic Front, (a political party without seats in Parliament). It had included many volunteers in the South African 32 Buffalo Battalion. The coup started with soldiers taking control of strategic sites and arresting Prime Minister Maria das Neves and the Oil Minister, the Prime Minister having suffered a heart attack from the gunfight in his home. Although the coup had affected São Tomé, it had not affected the island of Príncipe. In a press conference, Pereira claimed the poor living conditions of those in the military drove him to rebel.

Aftermath
Negotiations between the government and the coup leaders began on the second day of the coup. The rebels accepted to relinquish control provided that they received amnesty from the government and that an election be held and a new government take office. South African diplomats were involved in the negotiations with the 32 Buffalo Battalion involved in the coup.

See also
History of São Tomé and Príncipe
1995 São Tomé and Príncipe coup d'état attempt
2022 São Tomé and Príncipe coup d'état attempt

References

São Tomé and Príncipe coup d'état attempt, 2003
São Tomé and Príncipe coup d'état attempt
History of São Tomé and Príncipe
Attempted coups d'état in São Tomé and Príncipe
São Tomé and Príncipe coup d'état attempt
Coup d'état attempt